Tangren Media Co. Ltd., formerly known as Chinese Entertainment Shanghai Limited, is a Chinese entertainment and media company established in 1998 that provides investment, production and publishment of films, TV series, and cartoons.

It is currently headquartered in Tianjin, and previously in Shanghai. It has branch offices/agencies in Beijing, Hengdian (Chinese:横店), Hong Kong and Taiwan, and a publishing network in China, Singapore, Malaysia, India, Japan, Korea, Vietnam, America, Canada and Europe. It has released versions of work in Chinese, English, Cantonese, Korean and other languages.

Actors and actresses

Current

Male
Hu Ge 
Elvis Han
Lin Yi
Li Yu (李彧)
Tu Nan (屠楠)

Female
Li Landi
Hu Bingqing  
Chen Yao
Chen Yu'an (陈语安)

Past
Sun Li (孫莉)
Yuan Hong 
Guo Xiaoting (郭晓婷)
Lin Gengxin
Jiang Jinfu
Sun Yizhou 
Liu Shishi
Xiao Caiqi (小彩旗)
Cya Liu (刘雅瑟)
Li Sicheng (李思澄)
Wang Yilin (王藝霖)
Jin Chen
Gulnazar (古力娜扎)
Zhang Yueyun (章乐韵)

Television series

Films

Company team members

References 

 
Mass media companies of China
Companies based in Shanghai
Mass media companies established in 1998
Chinese companies established in 1998